The Patient Self-Determination Act (PSDA) was passed by the United States Congress in 1990 as an amendment to the Omnibus Budget Reconciliation Act of 1990. Effective on December 1, 1991, this legislation required many hospitals, nursing homes, home health agencies, hospice providers, health maintenance organizations (HMOs), and other health care institutions to provide information about advance health care directives to adult patients upon their admission to the healthcare facility. This law does not apply to individual physicians.

Because the 1991 PSDA does not apply to individual physicians, private clinics and practices, most of which are incorporated for-profit organizations, the problem of cruel over treatment for profit of the elderly on Medicare/Medicaid was not controlled to the extent that Congress hoped would be possible when the states would implement the goals of the 1991 PSDA in state laws. (In 2012, newspapers revealed that the United States Department of Health and Human Services and the Department of Justice have cooperated to prosecute over treatment of patients under the federal False Claims Act.) The goals of the 1991 PSDA are covered in the "Purpose" section, below.

Section 1233 of the proposed America's Affordable Health Choices Act of 2009 (H.R. 3200) would have authorized reimbursements for physician counseling regarding advance directives (once every five years) but it was not included in the Patient Protection and Affordable Care Act of 2010 because of controversy over what were characterized as "death panels."

Unfortunately, because the law of the 1991 PSDA does not require or mandate the treating physicians—after an educated "terminal" prognosis that is shared with the patient—to seek informed consent from elderly and terminal Medicare/Medicaid patients for either Curative Care under Medicare or palliative care, transition to Hospice in the last six months of life (also paid for out of the Medicare purse), the goals of the PSDA are not realized. Patient self rationing of expensive medical care at the end of life through the process of the advance directive under the provisions of the 1991 PSDA is discouraged because the patients have not had end-of-life conversations with the treating physicians.

Requirements
The requirements of the PSDA are as follows:
Patients are given written notice upon admission to the health care facility of their decision-making rights, and policies regarding advance health care directives in their state and in the institution to which they have been admitted. Patient rights include:
The right to facilitate their own health care decisions
The right to accept or refuse medical treatment
The right to make an advance health care directive
Facilities must inquire as to whether the patient already has an advance health care directive, and make note of this in their medical records.
Facilities must provide education to their staff and affiliates about advance health care directives.
Health care providers are not allowed to discriminately admit or treat patients based on whether or not they have an advance health care directive.

Purpose
The purpose of the Patient Self-Determination Act was/is to inform patients of their rights regarding decisions toward their own medical care, and ensure that these rights are communicated by the health care provider. Specifically, the rights ensured are those of the patient to dictate their future care (by means such as living will or power of attorney), should they become incapacitated.

The goals of the "purpose" of the Patient Self-Determination Act are/were (1) to prevent cruel over treatment of elderly/disabled Medicare/Medicaid patients for the profit motive and (2) to save money for Medicare and the private insurers in the form of the reduction of end-of-life costs for Medicare and the private insurers when elderly Medicare/Medicaid patients would ELECT/CHOOSE to refuse expensive ICU/CCU life-extending or life-saving treatments in the hospital in order to shorten their suffering unto a certain death. It was envisioned by the framers of the 1991 PSDA that the elderly/disabled on Medicare/Medicaid would die less expensively and more comfortably (out of pain) on the palliative care/Hospice Medicare Entitlement in their own personal residence or in the setting of a residential nursing home when the treating physicians consulted with them about their terminal diagnoses.

References

Further reading

External links
 

1990 in law
United States federal health legislation